This is a list of notable long-distance trails in the United States, with a minimum length of 30 miles.

See also 
 National Trails System
 National Millennium Trail project – 16 long-distance trails selected in 2000 as visionary trails that reflect defining aspects America's history and culture
 Triple Crown of Hiking - term for completing the three major trails (Pacific Crest, Appalachian, Continental Divide)
 List of long-distance footpaths
 State wildlife trails (United States)
 European long-distance paths

References

External links 
 American Trails
 American Long Distance Hiking Association- West
 Appalachian Long Distance Hikers Association
 American Hiking Society
 Appalachian Trail Conservancy
 Buckeye Trail Association
 Desert Trail information
 Hike and Bike Trails at Land Between The Lakes